Let's Ride is the third studio album by American singer Montell Jordan. It was released by Def Jam Recordings on March 31, 1998 in the United States. The album peaked at number 20 on the US Billboard 200 and number eight on Billboards Top R&B/Hip-Hop Albums, becoming Jordan's highest-charting album. It was certified gold by the Recording Industry Association of America (RIAA) on May 4, 1998. The album spawned two hit singles, the title track, which went to number 2 on the US Billboard Hot 100, and "I Can Do That", which made it to number 14 on the Hot 100.

Track listing

Charts

Weekly charts

Year-end charts

Certifications

References

Montell Jordan albums
Def Jam Recordings albums
1998 albums